Senator Gustafson may refer to:

Earl B. Gustafson (1927–2018), Minnesota State Senate 
James Gustafson (politician) (1938–2014), Minnesota State Senate